Conchita Martínez and Virginia Ruano Pascual were the defending champions, but Martínez chose not to participate that year.

Ruano Pascual played alongside Paola Suárez, but lost in the quarterfinals to Cara Black and Rennae Stubbs.

Black and Stubbs reached the final where they beat Anna-Lena Grönefeld and Meghann Shaughnessy 6-2, 6-2 to win their title.

Seeds

Draws

Finals

Section 1

Section 2

External links
 ITF tournament details

Acura Classic - Doubles